Syedna Hebatullah-il-Muʾayyad Fiddeen bin Syedna Ibrahim Wajihuddin (Died: 1st Shaban 1193 AH (13 August 1779 AD)) was the 40th Dā'ī al-Mutlaq of the Dawoodi Bohra sect. He succeeded his father, the 39th Dā'ī al-Mutlaq, Syedna Ibrahim Wajihuddin to the religious post.

Life 
Syedna Hebatullah was born in 1713 AD and was educated by his father Syedna Ibrahim Wajihuddin. He became Dā'ī in 1756 AD (1168 AH) at the age of 43. His period of Da'wat was from then until his death at the age of 68 (1780 AD (1200 AH)).

During his tenure, a group of dissidents called Hebtiyas emerged led by Ismail bin Abdur-Rasool and supported by Ismail's son Hebatullah.

Syedna Hebatullah-il-Muʾayyad had two sons; Syedi Shamsuddin and Syedi Qamruddin. Syedi Shamsuddin married the daughter of Syedi Khan and Syedi Qamruddin married daughter of MiyaSaheb Yusuf bin Faizullah.

Muʾayyad Fiddeen's deputies were: 
 Mawazeen: Syedi Lukmanji bin Sheikh Dawood, Syedi Khan Bahadur, Sheikh Fazal Abdultaiyyeb, Syedi Hamza
 Mukasir: Syedi AbdeMusa Kalimuddin

Succession 
Syedna Abduttayyeb Zakiuddin succeeded Syedna Hebatullah-il-Muʾayyad Fiddeen as the 41st Da'i al-Mutlaq in 1780 AD (1200 AH).

References

Further reading
 
 
 

Dawoodi Bohra da'is
18th-century deaths 
Year of death uncertain
Year of birth unknown
18th-century Ismailis